In the Still of the Night is an album by American pop singer Johnny Mathis that was released on August 8, 1989, by Columbia Records and continues the trend that began with his 1986 collaboration with Henry Mancini, The Hollywood Musicals, in that the project is devoted to a specific theme that ties the songs together. Mathis hints at the theme for this album in the liner notes for his 1993 box set The Music of Johnny Mathis: A Personal Collection, where he gives his thoughts on the 1964 Little Anthony and the Imperials song "I'm on the Outside Looking In" that he covered for his 1988 album Once in a While: "That was group singers' kind of material. I was singing other stuff. It wasn't the picture of the lone crooner standing in the spotlight. That's what I was doing when all this other stuff was going on. I never listened to it until it was brought to my attention by [that album's producers] Peter Bunetta and Rick Chudacoff." Mathis chose to continue his work with Bunetta and Chudacoff on this project, which focuses on "this other stuff" that Mathis refers to: pop and R&B hits from the 1950s and 1960s.

Reception

Although the album did not make it onto Billboard magazine's  Top Pop Albums chart, it did receive praise in People magazine, where the reviewer remarks that Mathis and the album producers "make these songs sound reconsidered, not merely recycled." It's also noted that "Mathis's ability to extract every last nuance from a lyric has never been employed to better advantage" and that "Take 6's presence enables him to prove that he can keep up with the younger generation."

The album also received a positive retrospective review from Allmusic, where Bil Carpenter wrote, "Clean, uncomplicated orchestration" and "One of Mathis's best recordings to date."

Track listing

Recording dates
From the liner notes for The Voice of Romance: The Columbia Original Album Collection:
May 1988–December 1988 –  "All Alone Am I", "The End of the World", "Since I Don't Have You", "Then You Can Tell Me Goodbye", "True Love Ways", "You Belong to Me"
July 27, 1988 – "For Your Love", "In the Still of the Night", "It's All in the Game", "Since I Fell for You"

Personnel
From the liner notes for the original album:

Johnny Mathis – vocals
Peter Bunetta – producer 
Rick Chudacoff – producer 
Jay Landers – executive producer
Cedric Dent – arranger (background vocals)
Mervyn Warren – arranger (background vocals)
Gary Brandt – recording engineer
Marc Ettel – recording engineer
Daren Klein – recording engineer
Frank Wolf – recording engineer
Mick Guzauski – mixing engineer
 Mixed at Conway Studios, Hollywood, California
Bernie Grundman – mastering engineer
Mastered at Bernie Grundman Mastering, Hollywood, California
Don Adey – assistant engineer (Alpha)
Bryant Arnett – assistant engineer (Conway)
Kristen Connolly – assistant engineer (Smoketree)
Richard McKernan – assistant engineer (Conway)
Marnie Riley – assistant engineer (Conway)
Steve Satkowski – assistant engineer (Alpha)
24 Collection, Bal Harbour – wardrobe
Kyle Plyer – styling
Deev – grooming
Rebecca Chamlee Keeley – art direction
David Vance – photographer

Musicians 
Garrett Adkins – trombone
Rick Braun – trumpets
Peter Bunetta – drums
Sonny Burke – organ
Alvin Chea (Take 6) – background vocals; featured vocals ("In the Still of the Night", "It's All in the Game")
Rick Chudacoff – bass
Brad Cole – keyboards
Cedric Dent (Take 6) – background vocals; featured vocals ("In the Still of the Night", "It's All in the Game") 
Bill Elliott – keyboards
Melvin Franklin – background vocals
Mara Getz – background vocals
John Helliwell – clarinet and tenor sax
Dann Huff – guitar 
Mark Kibble (Take 6) – background vocals; featured vocals ("In the Still of the Night", "It's All in the Game") 
Darrell Leonard – trumpet
Claude McKnight III (Take 6) – background vocals; featured vocals ("In the Still of the Night", "It's All in the Game") 
Doug Norwine – tenor sax
Jimmy Roberts – tenor sax
Amy Shulman – harp
Leslie Smith – background vocals
David Thomas (Take 6) – background vocals; featured vocals ("In the Still of the Night", "It's All in the Game") 
Mervyn Warren (Take 6) – background vocals; featured vocals ("In the Still of the Night", "It's All in the Game") 
David Woodford – baritone sax and flute

References

Bibliography

 

1989 albums
Johnny Mathis albums
Columbia Records albums